Columbiana is a city in northern Columbiana and southern Mahoning counties in the U.S. state of Ohio. The population was 6,559 at the 2020 census. It is part of the Salem micropolitan area and the Youngstown–Warren metropolitan area.

The city hosts the annual Shaker Woods Arts & Crafts Festival, which brings national attention to the city in the summer and fall seasons.  The childhood home of notable inventor and businessman Harvey S. Firestone, Columbiana is home to the 1930s-themed Firestone Farms shopping and business park. In 2019, Columbiana was named "The Nicest Place In America" by Reader's Digest.

History

Columbiana was laid out by Joshua Dixon and William Heald in 1805. The city takes its name from Columbiana County, which itself is named in honor of Christopher Columbus, combining his surname with the mass noun suffix -iana.  Columbiana was incorporated as a village in 1837. The village officially became a city in 2000.

Geography
Columbiana is located at  (40.885579, -80.688327). Most of the city is located in Fairfield Township, Columbiana County, which in turn includes most of Columbiana's incorporated land in Columbiana County. A district of northern Columbiana lies in Beaver Township, Mahoning County, and another small portion to the east lies in Unity Township, Columbiana County.

Demographics

2010 census
At the 2010 census there were 6,384 people in 2,881 households, including 1,763 families, in the city. The racial makeup of the city was 97.7% White, 0.6% African American, 0.5% Asian, 0.4% from other races, and 0.8% from two or more races. Hispanic or Latino people of any race were 1.0%.

Of the 2,881 households 21.6% had children under the age of 18 living with them, 49.3% were married couples living together, 8.5% had a female householder with no husband present, 3.4% had a male householder with no wife present, and 38.8% were non-families. 34.5% of households were one person and 18.4% were one person aged 65 or older. The average household size was 2.15 and the average family size was 2.74.

The median age was 49.4 years. 17.5% of residents were under the age of 18; 7.6% were between the ages of 18 and 24; 19.9% were from 25 to 44; 27.7% were from 45 to 64; and 27.4% were 65 or older. The gender makeup of the city was 46.6% male and 53.4% female.

2000 census
At the 2000 census there were 5,635 people in 2,534 households, including 1,576 families, in the city. The population density was 930.4 people per square mile (359.0/km). There were 2,707 housing units at an average density of 446.9 per square mile (172.5/km).  The racial makeup of the city was 98.86% White, 0.11% African American, 0.07% Native American, 0.18% Asian, 0.02% Pacific Islander, 0.07% from other races, and 0.69% from two or more races. Hispanic or Latino people of any race were 0.32%.

Of the 2,534 households 22.2% had children under the age of 18 living with them, 51.8% were married couples living together, 7.5% had a female householder with no husband present, and 37.8% were non-families. 34.9% of households were one person and 17.7% were one person aged 65 or older. The average household size was 2.15 and the average family size was 2.76.

The age distribution was 19.0% under the age of 18, 6.8% from 18 to 24, 23.5% from 25 to 44, 25.3% from 45 to 64, and 25.3% 65 or older. The median age was 46 years. For every 100 females, there were 87.3 males. For every 100 females age 18 and over, there were 82.1 males.

The median household income was $34,560 and the median family income  was $42,363. Males had a median income of $33,693 versus $21,648 for females. The per capita income for the city was $19,727. About 4.9% of families and 6.5% of the population were below the poverty line, including 7.8% of those under age 18 and 6.1% of those age 65 or over.

Arts and culture

Throughout the year, many events are hosted in the city. During the summer, the Shaker Woods Festival showcases over 200 crafters and artisans from across the nation during August. Additionally, the city hosts a Fourth of July fireworks festival, as well as the Harvey S. Firestone Festival of the Arts. In the fall, the American Legion hosts a civic Street Fair, followed by Christmas in the Woods, which is another large-scale craft event held on the Shaker Woods grounds. During the holiday season, the city features the Joy of Christmas Holiday Light Festival. For spring, Columbiana features an outdoor French Market in May, and the Columbiana Wine Festival in June.

The city contains a public library, first opened in 1933.

Government
Columbiana operates under a chartered council–manager government, where there are six council members elected as a legislature for 4-year terms in addition to a mayor, who serves as an executive. The council employs a city manager for administration. The current mayor is Rick Noel, and the current city manager is Lance Willard.

Education
Children in Columbiana are served by the Columbiana Exempted Village School District. The current schools serving Columbiana are:
 Joshua Dixon Elementary School – grades K-4
 Columbiana Middle School – grades 5-8
 Columbiana High School – grades 9-12

Some local children attend Heartland Christian School, which first opened for the 1996–1997 school year.  The school's philosophy is based on the Bible.

Transportation
The following highways pass through Columbiana: 
   State Route 7
   State Route 14
   State Route 46
   State Route 164

The city lies along portions of the Norfolk Southern Railway Fort Wayne Line and the Youngstown and Southeastern Railroad.

Notable people
 Pete Allen, Major League Baseball catcher, proctologist
 J. Warren Bettis, jurist
 Linda Bolon, member of the Ohio House of Representatives from the 1st district 
 Harvey Firestone, businessman & founder of the Firestone Tire and Rubber Company
 Jacob Hostetter, U.S. Representative from Pennsylvania's 4th District
 Craig Newbold, member of the Ohio House of Representatives from the 1st district
 John D. Shivers Jr., member of the Ohio House of Representatives from the 3rd district
 Paul Stamets, mycologist, advocate of medicinal fungi and mycoremediation
 William Thornton Watson, New Zealander officer in the Australian Imperial Force in both World Wars, Commanding Officer of the Papuan Infantry Battalion, Australia national rugby union team captain, Australian vice-consul to New York City
 Clarence Wetzel, member of the Ohio House of Representatives from the 34th district
 Jason Wilson, member of the Ohio Senate from the 30th district

References

External links
 City website
 Columbiana Chamber of Commerce

 
Cities in Columbiana County, Ohio
Cities in Mahoning County, Ohio
Populated places established in 1805
1805 establishments in Ohio
Cities in Ohio